Micol Fontana (8 November 1913 – 12 June 2015) was an Italian stylist and entrepreneur, co-founder of the Sorelle Fontana fashion house.

Biography 
Born in Traversetolo, Parma, Micol Fontana and her sisters Zoe and Giovanna moved to Rome in 1936 to launch a fashion career. They worked small jobs in the industry and finally opened their own shop, Casa di moda sorelle Fontana, in 1943.

In 1953 - along with her sisters and other famous fashion designers including Alberto Fabiani, Vincenzo Ferdinandi, Emilio Schuberth, Jole Veneziani, Giovannelli-Sciarra, Mingolini-Guggenheim, Eleanora Garnett and Simonetta - she founded the S.I.A.M. - Italian High Fashion Syndicate.

In 1957, the sisters designed Linda Christian's wedding dress for her marriage to Tyrone Power.

Following the death of her sisters, and after selling the company and the brand to an Italian  financial group in 1992, Micol created  the Micol Fontana Foundation in 1994 with the purpose of finding and promoting new fashion talents.

Popular Culture
As the designer of Margaret Truman's (daughter of U.S. President Harry S. Truman) wedding gown, Micol Fontana was invited to appear as a mystery guest on the Apr 15, 1956 episode of What's My Line?.  The Truman wedding occurred a few days later on April 21, 1956. 

In La Dolce Vita, the tightly moulded priest’s cassock wore by Anita Ekberg in St Peter’s basilica was designed by Micol Fontana. 

A two-parts television  miniseries based on the story of her fashion house, Atelier Fontana - Le sorelle della moda, was broadcast on Rai 1 in 2011, with Micol Fontana making a brief cameo as herself.

See also 
 Sorelle Fontana

References

External links 

 Fondazione Micol Fontana website

1913 births
2015 deaths
Italian centenarians
People from the Province of Parma
Fashion designers from Rome
Women centenarians